Under Two Jags is a 1923 American silent comedy film featuring Stan Laurel. The title spoofs the film Under Two Flags (1922).

Plot

The film is set in the city of Scorching Sands in the Desert of Dhumbell.

Stan is the only westerner on the street until he enters a saloon which has soldiers watching a girl in uniform (and wearing a fez) dancing on a table. Stan blows the foam off his beer and it hits the officer in the face. He beckons Stan over. He is about to leave when the girl says Stop. He flips a coin and decides to join the soldiers.

Stan is then in uniform chatting with the girl. A posh lady stops to speak to him. Stan drops a bottle of beer and the spray soaks everyone.

On parade Stan is ten seconds behind the rest and struggles to find a place in the row. The men form a ladder of rifles and he climbs a wall. The officer kisses each man on the cheek as he gives out medals. Stan pushes the officer away when he goes to kiss him.

Stan is locked in the stockade but the door falls off. He is stood against a pole to be shot. Alongside a man digs a grave. They blindfold him and prepare to shoot, but the girl rides up and saves him

Cast
 Stan Laurel
 Katherine Grant as The Princess
 Mae Laurel as Cheroot
 Sammy Brooks as Gunner (credited as Sam Brooks)
 Charles Stevenson as Arab Officer (credited as Charles E. Stevenson)
 William Gillespie as Officer
 Eddie Baker as Bit Role (uncredited)
 Roy Brooks as Bit Role (uncredited)
 George Rowe as Bit Role (uncredited)

References

External links

1923 films
American silent short films
American black-and-white films
1923 comedy films
1923 short films
Films directed by George Jeske
Silent American comedy films
American comedy short films
1920s American films